Bamert is a surname. Notable people with the surname include:
 Jan Bamert (born 1998), Swiss footballer
 Jürg Bamert (born 1982), Swiss curler
 Matthias Bamert (born 1942), Swiss composer and conductor
 Maya Bamert (born 1979), Swiss bobsledder